This is a list of equipment of the Royal Marines currently in use. It includes personal equipment, small arms, combat vehicles and watercraft. The Royal Marines are a highly specialised and adaptable light infantry force, a part of His Majesty's Naval Service. The equipment of the Royal Marines has a high degree of commonality with other arms of the British Armed Forces – particularly the British Army – but includes some unique items.

To meet their commitments, the equipment of the armed forces is periodically updated and modified. Programs exist to ensure the Royal Marines are suitably equipped for both current conflicts and expected future conflicts, with any shortcomings in equipment addressed as Urgent Operational Requirements (UOR), which supplements planned equipment programmes.

Infantry equipment

Personal equipment

Helmet

Combat Body Armour

Respirator

The General Service Respirator replaces the older S10 respirator. These respirators are also used by the rest of the Naval Service, the British Army and Royal Air Force.

Uniforms

Weapons

Watercraft

Vehicles
The Royal Marines maintain no heavy armoured units, instead, they operate a fleet of lightly armoured and highly mobile vehicles intended for amphibious landings or rapid deployment. The primary armoured fighting vehicle operated by the Armoured Support Group is the BvS 10 Viking All Terrain Armoured Vehicle. Other, lighter vehicles include the Land Rover Wolf Armoured Patrol Vehicle, the Jackal (MWMIK) Armoured Vehicle and the Pinzgauer High Mobility All-Terrain Vehicle.

See also
 List of equipment of the British Army

References

British Armed Forces
Military equipment of the United Kingdom